York Minster Lamp Standard is a lamp standard that is located about  west of York Minster in the English city of York. It is a Grade II listed structure erected around 1860.

The lamp was manufactured by York's Walker Iron Foundry in Walmgate. It is made of cast iron, in an octagonal column, with trefoil headed panelled sides surmounted by tapering octagonal shaft on a moulded pedestal. It has a  plain cross bar and cusped and traceried spandrels. Two lanterns are square and tapering with acorn finials.

Gallery

References

Grade II listed buildings in York
York Minster
Individual lamps
1860 establishments in England
Buildings and structures completed in 1860